Reviews of Human Factors and Ergonomics is a quarterly peer-reviewed academic journal that covers research in the field of Ergonomics. It was established in 2005 and is published by SAGE Publications on behalf of the Human Factors and Ergonomics Society. It is abstracted and indexed in Scopus.

External links 
 

SAGE Publishing academic journals
English-language journals
Occupational safety and health journals
Annual journals
Publications established in 2005